David Blackburn (1 January 1753 – 10 January 1795) was a Royal Navy officer.

Early life
Blackburn was born on 1 January 1753 at Newbury, Berkshire, England. He was eldest son of Rev. John Blackburn and his wife Elizabeth, née Martineau. His family moved to Norwich after John's death in 1762.

Career

First Fleet
In April 1787 he was appointed master of Supply, part of the First Fleet that established British settlement in New South Wales. During this time he wrote a series of letters to family members and friends, many of which are still extant. These letters describe the events of the voyage and the early days of settlement, including Blackburn's participation in the expedition to Norfolk Island to establish a settlement there in February 1788. Blackburn's letters record the change in his feelings towards the voyage. Initially reluctant to join the Fleet, shortly before the Fleet left he told his letter in a letter that "my dislike to the voyage begins gradually to wear off". 
Supply was part of the advance party of ships which arrived in Botany Bay on 18 January. Blackburn also joined Phillip's expedition in search of a better location for the settlement, and describes Sydney Harbour as "excellent and extensive".

Death
He died of illness on 10 January 1795 at Haslar Naval Hospital, Gosport, Hampshire, England.

References

1753 births
1795 deaths
Explorers of Australia
18th-century deaths from tuberculosis
Tuberculosis deaths in England
First Fleet